Portsmouth & Southsea railway station is a Grade II listed building and the main railway station in the Landport area of the city of Portsmouth in Hampshire, England. It is close to the Commercial Road shopping area. British Transport Police maintain a presence at the station. There is a taxi rank at the front of the building and regular local buses within five minutes' walking distance.

The station, which is managed by South Western Railway, has ticket barriers in operation.

History

An earlier and smaller station building was opened as Portsmouth on 14 June 1847 and served as a terminus station. The present station was built in 1866 and was further extended via additional high level platforms to Portsmouth Harbour in 1876. It was later renamed Portsmouth Town on 2 October 1876 to avoid confusion with other stations in Portsmouth, such as Portsmouth Harbour.

The station's present-day name of Portsmouth & Southsea originates from after the closure of the Southsea Railway branch line, which had a terminus station in Southsea named East Southsea from 1885-1914. Competing trams and trolleybuses put the Southsea Railway out of business and it was closed in 1914. Train passengers and tourists bound for Southsea were then diverted to Portsmouth's main railway station, Portsmouth Town which was later renamed Portsmouth & Southsea in 1925. A year later, the town of Southsea became officially integrated into the city of Portsmouth on 21 April 1926.

Portsmouth & Southsea station was once the junction for the Portsmouth Dockyard branch, known as the Admiralty Line. The line branched off from the west end of today's platform 1 and passed through Victoria Park, close to the rear of Stanhope Road, before crossing Bishop Crispian Way via a level crossing (the gates still exist) and entering the naval base at the Unicorn Gate.

During the 1980s, Portsmouth & Southsea station lost three of its five low level platforms to redevelopment, a large retail store and car park were built on their location to the south of Station Street. 

Part of the station, specifically the 1980s canopy over high level platforms 1 and 2, is still in its original red Network SouthEast livery. In early 2021 strengthening work was carried on Landport Viaduct which carries the high level platforms 1 & 2.

Presently, the station is still informally and colloquially known as Town Station by Portsmouth's local population, despite Portsmouth having been awarded city status on 21 April 1926.

Services 

The station is located on the Portsmouth Direct Line which runs between London Waterloo and Portsmouth Harbour. In addition there are regular services to Cardiff Central, Bristol Temple Meads, Southampton Central, Eastleigh, Woking, Brighton, Gatwick Airport, East Croydon and London Victoria. The station is split into two distinct parts: the high level island (Platforms 1 and 2) for through trains to the Harbour, and the low level (bay Platforms 3 and 4) where some trains terminate. In addition, Hovertravel run a bus service from Portsmouth & Southsea which connects to their Hovercraft service from Southsea to the Isle of Wight. The IoW terminal is located next to Ryde Esplanade, with a single price ticket for journeys via rail/hover/rail, similar to that provided by Wightlink from Portsmouth Harbour.

The Monday-Saturday off-peak service is:

South Western Railway:
 3 tph to  via Guildford (2 fast, 1 stopping)
 1 tph to  via  Basingstoke
 3 tph to 
 1 tph to 

Southern:
 1 tph to  via Horsham
 1 tph to Littlehampton
 1 tph to 
 1 tph to 

Great Western Railway:
 1 tph to  via 
 1 tph to

References

External links 

Railway stations in Portsmouth
DfT Category C1 stations
Grade II* listed buildings in Hampshire
Former Portsmouth and Ryde Joint Railway stations
Railway stations in Great Britain opened in 1847
Railway stations served by Great Western Railway
Railway stations served by Govia Thameslink Railway
Railway stations served by South Western Railway
1847 establishments in England